Ma Jianping (born 15 March 1961) is a Chinese weightlifter and weightlifting coach. He competed in the men's lightweight event at the 1984 Summer Olympics.

References

External links
 

1961 births
Living people
Chinese male weightlifters
Olympic weightlifters of China
Weightlifters at the 1984 Summer Olympics
Place of birth missing (living people)
20th-century Chinese people